Garry Brown may refer to:

 Garry E. Brown (1923–1998), US politician
 Garry Brown (artist), creator of comics such as Black Road
 Garry Brown (athlete) (born 1954), Australian hurdler
 Garry A. Brown (politician), chairman of the New York Public Service Commission (PSC)
 Garry A. Brown (producer), American television producer

See also
 Gary Brown (disambiguation)
 Gary Browne (disambiguation)